USS Willapa (AVG-53/ACV-53/CVE-53) was a  escort carrier (originally an auxiliary aircraft carrier) built during World War II for the United States Navy. Never seeing American service, the ship was transferred to the United Kingdom as part of Lend-Lease. The escort carrier was renamed HMS Puncher (D79)  of the British  and crewed by the Royal Canadian Navy with aircrew from the Fleet Air Arm. Primarily used as an aircraft transport, Puncher took part in operations along the Norwegian coast towards the end of the war. Following the war the ship was converted for mercantile service and renamed Muncaster Castle, Bardic and Ben Nevis, before being broken up in 1973.

Design and description

The Bogue class were larger and had a greater aircraft capacity than all the preceding American-built escort carriers. They were also all laid down as escort carriers and not converted merchant ships.

Aircraft operations were commanded from a small combined bridge–flight control on the starboard side of the ship. Aircraft could be housed in the  hangar below the flight deck. However, the sloping contour of the hangar combined with the elevator arrangement made handling and storage of aircraft difficult and time-consuming. The escort carriers could store  of avgas. They had a maximum aircraft capacity of twenty-four aircraft which could be a mixture of fighter and anti-submarine (ASW) aircraft, though up to 90 could be ferried.

Armament comprised two Mark 9 /51 calibre guns, eight twin-mounted 40 mm Bofors guns, fourteen twin-mounted 20 mm Oerlikon cannon and seven single-mounted 20 mm Oerlikon cannon. Since the escort carriers came as part of Lend-Lease, they retained their American radar systems, with the SG  surface radar and the SK  air search radar.

Construction and career
Willapa was laid down on 21 May 1943 at Seattle, Washington, by the Seattle-Tacoma Shipbuilding Corporation and reclassified CVE-53 on 10 June 1943. Willapa was launched on 8 November 1943. The ship was completed and transferred under lend-lease to the Royal Navy on 5 February 1944 and commissioned as HMS Puncher with the pennant number D79. On 15 March 1944, Puncher arrived at Vancouver to undergo conversion to Royal Navy standards. The British Admiralty had determined that, post-World War II, the Royal Canadian Navy would have its own aircraft carriers. However, as the Royal Canadian Navy lacked trained air personnel, the aircrew was from the Fleet Air Arm. Puncher remained under British control due to stipulations in the Lend-Lease act that prevented the Royal Navy from transferring Lend-Lease equipment to a third party.

Puncher spent the war in the Atlantic Ocean and Mediterranean Sea. In June 1944, the escort carrier transported motor launches from New Orleans to New York. The following month, the ship transported United States Army Air Force aircraft from Norfolk, Virginia, to Casablanca in North Africa, then returned to Norfolk. From there, Puncher made two more ferry trips, taking the Vought Corsairs meant for 1845 Naval Air Squadron to the United Kingdom. Following the ferry trips, Puncher put in for repairs to builder's defects. On 21 November 1944, Puncher embarked 821 Naval Air Squadron for trials in the Clyde area. However, on 22 November, the ship suffered a main gear failure and was forced to return to port for repairs. The gearbox proved too damaged for repair, and her sister ship, Nabob, had been laid up at Firth of Forth due to being torpedoed off Norway in August 1944, so a gearbox was removed from Nabob and installed aboard Puncher.

On 1 February 1945, Puncher joined the British Home Fleet at Scapa Flow, embarking 881 Naval Air Squadron in Grumman Wildcats and 821 Naval Air Squadron in Fairey Barracudas. Initially serving in a training role, within the year, Puncher was re-tasked to both airstrike and convoy air protection (CAP), as the damaged Nabob had been decommissioned. Punchers CAP service included protection of six different Arctic convoys on the Murmansk/Arkhangelsk route. Operations also included strikes against German occupied Norway, hitting industrial and shipping targets such as the steel works at Narvik. On 11 February, Punchers Wildcats formed part of the fighter escort for a minelaying airstrike along the western coast of Norway. The escort carrier's aircraft then provided fighter cover for a British minesweeping mission clearing German-laid mines along the Norwegian coast. On 24 March, Punchers aircraft took part in an airstrike in the area of Trondheim. A second strike was planned for 3 April but was cancelled due to bad weather. Beginning on 25 June 1945, following the surrender of Germany, Puncher was utilized as a troop transport, carrying Canadian soldiers back to Canada. Her hangar had bunks welded into them and was used in this role until the end of 1945.

Paid off on 16 February 1946 at Norfolk, Virginia and returned to American custody that day, the escort carrier was struck from the Navy Registry on 12 March 1946, having never seen active service with the United States Navy. The vessel was initially sold to William B. St. John, of New York City, on 9 January 1947. The ship was subsequently resold to the British firm J. Chambers & Co on 4 February 1947 and converted for mercantile service. The ship reappeared as Muncaster Castle in 1949 and was renamed Bardic in 1954. The vessel was sold to Ben Line Steamers in 1959 and renamed Ben Nevis (sometimes spelled as Bennevis). The vessel sailed under that name until she was sold for scrap and broken up at Kaoshiung, Taiwan on 11 June 1973 by Swie Horng Steel Enterprise Co.

Notes

Citations

References

External links

Ships of the Royal Canadian Navy
Ruler-class escort carriers
Ships built in Seattle
1943 ships
 
Aircraft carriers of Canada